The Brazilian Election Justice was created by Decree No. 21,076 of 24 February 1932, representing one of the innovations of the Brazilian Revolution of 1930. In 1932 there was the first edited Brazilian Election Code, inspired by the Election Justice of the Czech Republic and the ideas of Joaquim Francisco de Assis Brasil, a politician, farmer and ambassador

Supporting Law 
Nowadays, the existence and regulation of the Election Justice in Brazil is determined in the articles 118 to 121 of the Federal Constitution of 1988, that established its exclusive attribution of the Federal Union legislating about Election Law.

The Election Code and other laws give Executive and Legislative powers to the Superior Electoral Court (TSE). The law, even if it is named to provide Judicial powers, include an aggregation of administrative and normative functions as well.

Comparative law 
In other countries, the solutions adopted to distribution of powers in the election process differ from one country to the other. In Argentina and Finland the Executive Power itself administers the elections; In the United States, France and Germany, this role is played in city level; in Chile and Uruguay, there are independent organs, outside the Public Powers structure.

Functions
The functions  of Elections Justice are the following:

 Regulating the elections process
 Administration the elections process
 Inspecting the accomplishment of the law
 Inspecting the accounts of the elections campaigns
 Judging controversies about elections
 Punishing violations of elections law
 Answering queries about election regulation
 Judging appeals in election matters.

Bibliography 
 Amaral, R.;Cunha, S.S. da. Manual das Eleições, 3ª ed.São Paulo: Saraiva, 2006, 
 Anais do Seminário Brasileiro de Direito Eleitoral. Porto Alegre: Tribunal Regional Eleitoral do Rio Grande do Sul, 1990

See also 
 Elections in Brazil

References

External sources 
 Page of Tribunal Superior Eleitoral
 Page of Supremo Tribunal Federal
 Page of Conselho Nacional de Justiça
 Bibliografia sobre Direito Eleitoral Library of the Tribunal Superior Eleitoral

Judiciary of Brazil
Elections in Brazil